Nick Hallett may refer to:
 Nick Hallett (composer)
 Nick Hallett (Canadian football)